The 2011 Cork Junior A Hurling Championship was the 114th staging of the Cork Junior A Hurling Championship since its establishment by the Cork County Board in 1895. The championship began on 17 September 2011 and ended on 30 October 2011.

On 30 October 2011, Charleville won the championship following a 2-10 to 0-11 defeat of Mayfield in the final at Páirc Uí Rinn. This was their first championship title in the grade.

Charleville's James O'Brien was the championship's top scorer with 4-15.

Qualification

Results

First round

Semi-finals

Final

Championship statistics

Top scorers

Overall

In a single game

References

External link

 2011 Cork JAHC results

Cork Junior Hurling Championship
Cork Junior Hurling Championship